Commerce High School may refer to:
 Commerce High School (Commerce, Georgia)
 Commerce High School (Commerce, Texas)
 The High School of Commerce (New York City), 1922–1968 (first high school of its kind in the USA) "The High School of Commerce", Teachers College Columbia University. Accessed November 28, 2020.
High School of Commerce (Massachusetts)

See also
 High School of Commerce (Ottawa)

References